The 1904 New South Wales state election was held on 6 August 1904. It involved 90 electoral districts returning one member each, a reduction from 125 to 90. Women were given the right to vote for the first time in New South Wales elections, almost doubling the number of enrolled voters. As a result, it is not possible to tell the notional holder of a seat prior to the election.

Retiring members
Orange Liberal MLA Harry Newman died on 1 June. Deniliquin Independent MLA Joseph Evans died on 5 July. Due to the proximity of the election, no by-elections were held.

Progressive
Albert Chapman MLA (Braidwood)
William Davis MLA (Bourke)
James Gormly MLA (Wagga Wagga) — appointed to the Legislative Council.
James Hayes MLA (Murray) — appointed to the Legislative Council.
William Hurley MLA (Macquarie) — appointed to the Legislative Council.
Daniel O'Connor MLA (Sydney-Phillip)
Sir John See MLA (Grafton) — appointed to the Legislative Council.

Liberal
Samuel Whiddon MLA (Sydney-Cook)

Labor
John Power MLA (Sydney-Lang) — lost preselection

Independent
Frank Byrne MLA (Hay)
Thomas Griffith MLA (Albury)
Edward Terry MLA (Ryde)

Legislative Assembly
Sitting members are shown in bold text. Successful candidates are highlighted in the relevant colour.

See also
 Members of the New South Wales Legislative Assembly, 1904–1907
 Results of the 1904 New South Wales state election

Notes

References

1904